Craig W. Richards (born 1975) was the Attorney General of Alaska. He was nominated for the position by his former law partner, Governor Bill Walker in December 2014.

Richards was born in Fairbanks, Alaska. He received a degree in finance from the University of Virginia and an MBA from Duke University. He received his JD from Washington and Lee University School of Law. He clerked for United States District Court judge Ralph Beistline. Richards was an associate at the law firm Wohlforth, Vassar, Johnson & Brecht in Anchorage before joining the firm that later became Walker Richards with Bill Walker. He is experienced with oil and gas and taxation and represented municipalities in litigation over the assessment of the Trans-Alaska Pipeline System. Walker Richards represented the city of Valdez and secured over $1B in tax revenue for municipalities and the State of Alaska.

Richards was nominated for Attorney General of Alaska by Walker in December 2014. Richards announced his resignation as Attorney General on June 23, 2016, with the resignation effective immediately. Governor Bill Walker accepted his resignation, and thanked Richards for his service to the State of Alaska.

References

1975 births
Alaska Attorneys General
Alaska Republicans
Date of birth missing (living people)
Fuqua School of Business alumni
Living people
Lawyers from Anchorage, Alaska
Politicians from Fairbanks, Alaska
McIntire School of Commerce alumni
Washington and Lee University School of Law alumni
Lawyers from Fairbanks, Alaska
Politicians from Anchorage, Alaska